The Superior Court of California for and in the County of Santa Clara is the state trial court in and for Santa Clara County, California.

The Santa Clara Superior Court serves the public by providing equal justice for all in a fair, accessible, effective, efficient, and courteous manner;  resolving disputes under the law; applying the law consistently, impartially, and independently; instilling public trust and confidence in the court.

History

San Jose was chosen as the initial site for the state's capitol in 1849, which it held until 1851, when legislators voted to move to Vallejo. After Santa Clara County was formed on April 25, 1851, a contest was held to select a design for a new building worthy of being a state capitol in 1860.

The courthouse was destroyed by fire in May 1931. Reconstruction work began in December 1931 and completed in August 1932; a dedication ceremony for the reconstructed courthouse was held on September 17. As originally completed in 1868, the courthouse was topped by a copper-covered dome; the copper sheathing melted in the intense heat from the 1931 fire and the dome was removed during reconstruction. After the disastrous 1931 fire and rebuilding, it survives today as the Old Courthouse, which was listed on the National Register of Historic Places as part of the St. James Square National Historic District in 1979.

A modern courthouse was completed in 1964, replacing an older Hall of Records which had been built adjacent to the county courthouse. The Hall of Justice, located a few blocks to the north, was completed in 1991. The Family Justice Center was completed in 2016, consolidating court operations from six different facilities in a single building.

The doctrine of corporate personhood in US law is commonly traced to the 1886 decision of the United States Supreme Court in Santa Clara County v. Southern Pacific Railroad, which started in this court.

Courthouses

 Downtown Superior Court, Downtown San Jose
 Family Justice Center, Downtown San Jose
 Hall of Justice, San Jose
 Juvenile Justice Courthouse, San Jose
 Old Courthouse, Downtown San Jose
 Palo Alto Courthouse, Palo Alto
 Santa Clara Courthouse, Santa Clara
 South County Courthouse, Morgan Hill

Closed
 Park Center Family Court, Downtown San Jose (closed August 15, 2016)
 Notre Dame Courthouse, Notre Dame Avenue, Downtown San Jose (closed August 22, 2016)
 Ruff Drive Courthouse, Ruff Drive, San Jose (closed 2008)
 Sunnyvale Courthouse, Sunnyvale (closed August 15, 2016)
 Terraine Courthouse, Terraine Street, Downtown San Jose (closed August 22, 2016)

Areas Served
The Court serves the Incorporated Cities, Towns & Census Designated Places of Santa Clara County.
(Incorporated Cities and or Towns are marked with an asterisk (*).)

Alum Rock
Burbank
Cambrian Park
Campbell*
Cupertino*
East Foothills
Fruitdale
Gilroy*
Lexington Hills
Los Altos*
Los Altos Hills*
Los Gatos*
Loyola
Milpitas*
Monte Sereno*
Morgan Hill*
Mountain View*
Palo Alto*
San Jose*
San Martin
Santa Clara*
Saratoga*
Stanford
Sunnyvale*

Judges

Present
The following judicial officers serve on the Superior Court of California, Santa Clara County, as of June 2019:

Charles F. Adams
Javier Alcala
Julia L. Alloggiamento
Mary E. Arand
Jacqueline M. Arroyo
Kenneth Paul Barnum
Thang Nguyen Barrett
Paul R. Bernal
 Brooke A. Blecher
Arthur Bocanegra
Griffin M. J. Bonini
Shelyna V. Brown
David A. Cena
Sharon A. Chatman
Vincent J. Chiarello
Frederick S. Chung
Linda R. Clark
L. Michael Clark
Paul O. Colin
Le Jacqueline Duong
Julie A. Emede
Andrea E. Flint
Maureen A. Folan
Jose S. Franco
Eric S. Geffon
Matthew S. Harris
Robert Hawk
Roberta S. Hayashi
Cindy Seely Hendrickson
Joseph H. Huber
Audra Ibarra
Nahal Iravani-Sani
Nicole Isger
Peter H. Kirwan
Nona L. Klippen
Thomas E. Kuhnle
Sunil R. Kulkarni
Edward Frederick Lee
Cynthia C. Lie
Patricia M. Lucas
Katherine Lucero
Stephen V. Manley
Socrates Peter Manoukian
JoAnne McCracken
Beth A. R. McGowen
Michele McKay McCoy
William J. Monahan
Daniel T. Nishigaya
Carol W. Overton
Lori E. Pegg
Evette D. Pennypacker
Elizabeth C. Peterson
Mark H. Pierce
Hector E. Ramon
Amber Rosen
Christopher G. Rudy
Deborah A. Ryan
Panteha E. Saban
Shawna M. Schwarz
Stuart J. Scott
Cynthia A. Sevely
James L. Stoelker
Julianne Sylva
Drew C. Takaichi
Ronald I. Toff
Patrick E. Tondreau
James E. Towery
Jesus Valencia, Jr.
Brian Walsh
Joshua Weinstein
Helen E. Williams
Charles E. Wilson, II
Erica R. Yew
Theodore C. Zayner
Vanessa A. Zecher
Carrie A. Zepeda

Commissioners

 Christine Copeland
 Jillian M. Laxton
 Rebeca Esquivel-Pedroza
 Benjamin Williams
 Erik S. Johnson

Notable past judges

 LaDoris Cordell
 Edward J. Davila
 Jeremy Fogel
 Eugene Michael Hyman
 Lucy H. Koh
 Jack Komar
 Mary Jo Levinger
 Aaron Persky, Recalled by voters in 2018 after his sentencing of Brock Turner in People v. Turner

References

External links

Official website
Case information

Superior Court
Santa Clara